The Great Adventures of Captain Kidd (1953) was the 52nd  serial  released by Columbia Pictures. It is based in the historical figure of Captain William Kidd.

Plot
In 1697, agents Richard Dale and Alan Duncan are sent on an undercover mission by the British Fleet to find and gather information on the notorious pirate, Captain William Kidd. Dale and Duncan soon join Kidd's crew and discover, to their surprise, that the Captain is quite different from what they had expected.

Cast
Richard Crane as Richard Dale
David Bruce as Alan Duncan
John Crawford as Capt. Kidd (Crawford was equally proficient at playing both good and bad characters.  His casting added to ambiguity over Captain Kidd's guilt or innocence.)
George Wallace as Buller
Lee Roberts as DeVry
Paul Newlan as Long Ben Avery
Nick Stuart as Dr. Brandt
Terry Frost as Moore
John Hart as Jenkins
Marshall Reed as Capt. Culliford
Eduardo Cansino Jr. as Native

Production
This was the last costume serial and possibly the most faithful of the rare serial entries in the swashbuckling genre since Pirate Treasure.

The plot was based on the possibility that the real Captain Kidd was misjudged in an unfair trial.

Stock footage from feature films allowed the inclusion of seafaring scenes, which would have been too expensive to film on a serial budget.  This resulted in, according to Cline, "a unique flavour for which it is fondly remembered."

Chapter titles
 Pirate vs. Man-of-War
 The Fatal Shot
 Attacked by Captain Kidd
 Captured by Captain Kidd
 Mutiny on the Adventure's Galley
 Murder on the Main Deck
 Prisoners of War
 Mutiny Unmasked
 Pirate Against Pirate
 Shot from the Parapet
 The Flaming Fortress
 Before the Firing Squad
 In the Hands of the Mohawks
 Pirate Gold
 Captain Kidd's Last Chance
Source:

References

Sources
Cinefania.com

External links
 
 

1953 films
1950s English-language films
American black-and-white films
Columbia Pictures film serials
1953 adventure films
Films set in the 1690s
Films set in the 1700s
American adventure films
Films with screenplays by George H. Plympton
Cultural depictions of William Kidd
Films directed by Derwin Abrahams
1950s American films